Tienopramine is a tricyclic antidepressant (TCA) which was never marketed. It is an analogue of imipramine where one of the benzene rings has been replaced with a thiophene ring.

See also
Tricyclic antidepressant

References

Dimethylamino compounds
Nitrogen heterocycles
Tricyclic antidepressants
Sulfur heterocycles
Heterocyclic compounds with 3 rings